Smiley is a nickname of various notable people, including:

 Smiley (born 1980 as Tavis Nedd, now Tavis Scoot), Aruban-born reggae artist
 Smiley (born 1983), Romanian singer
 Smiley Adams (1935–2003), American trainer of Thoroughbred horses
 Simon Baker (born 1969), Australian actor (childhood nickname)
 Smiley Bates (1937–1997), Canadian country singer, songwriter, and musician
 Smiley Burnette (1911–1967), American country music performer and a comedic actor
 Warryn Campbell (born 1975), American record producer
 Smiley Creswell (born 1959), American professional gridiron football player
 Smiley Culture (1963–2011), British reggae singer and DJ
 Miley Cyrus (born 1992), American singer-songwriter and actress ("Miley" shortened from "Smiley")
 William (Smiley) Heather (born 1958), Cook Islands politician
 Smiley Lewis (1913–1966), American rhythm and blues singer and guitarist
 William Meronek (1917–1999), Canadian ice hockey player
 Smiley Quick (1909–1979), American professional golfer
 Arthur M. Ratliff (1924—2007), American teacher, author and businessman
 Eddie Turchin (1917–1982), American professional baseball infielder

Fictional characters
 Nickname of an alternate universe Miles O'Brien in Star Trek: Deep Space Nine
 Smiley, a character in the anime television series Sherlock Hound

See also
 Tim Keefe (1857–1933), American professional baseball player nicknamed "Smiling Tim"
 Smiley Face Killer (disambiguation), several people
 Guy Smiley, fictional character on Sesame Street
 Smilie Suri, Indian model
 Albert Smiley Williams (1849–1924), American politician in Tennessee

Lists of people by nickname